Jalan Letnan Jenderal S. Parman or Jalan S. Parman is an avenue in Jakarta, Indonesia.

The road is named after National Hero of Indonesia Lieutenant General S. Parman. This 4.2 KM road stretches from Grogol intersection to Slipi, West Jakarta. This road crosses urban 7 villages of Jakarta.

Slipi
Palmerah
Kemanggisan
Kota Bambu
Tanjung Duren North
Tanjung Duren South
Tomang

This road is traversed by Jakarta Inner Ring Road. Some of the largest malls in Jakarta Mall Ciputra, Central Park Jakarta and Mall Taman Anggrek located in this road. Tarumanegara University, Krida Wacana Christian University and Trisakti University are also located on this road at Tomang administrative village. The road is served by TransJakarta Corridor 9.

Important landmarks
Podomoro City
Ciputra Shopping Mall
Taman Anggrek Shopping Mall
Central Park Shopping Mall
Trisakti University
Tarumanegara University
Krida Wacana Christian University

Intersections
This road has 4 intersections, namely:
Intersection of Jalan Daan Mogot and Jalan Kyai Tapa
Junction of Jakarta-Tangerang Toll Road and Tomang Raya Road
Crossing southwest to Tanjung Duren and northeast to Tanah Abang
North Palmerah Road and Jalan Aipda KS Tubun

Transportation
Jalan S. Parman is served by TransJakarta Corridor 9. Other bus service providers such as Kopaja, Mayasari Bakti and APTB buses also operates different routes. DAMRI has routes that connects the road with Soekarno-Hatta International Airport.

See also

History of Jakarta

References

Transport in Jakarta
Roads of Jakarta
West Jakarta